Andre Lawrence (born 4 May 1969) is a Trinidadian cricketer. He played in six first-class and seventeen List A matches for Trinidad and Tobago from 1993 to 1999.

See also
 List of Trinidadian representative cricketers

References

External links
 

1969 births
Living people
Trinidad and Tobago cricketers